SS West Nohno was a cargo ship of the United States Shipping Board (USSB) launched shortly after the end of World War I. The ship was inspected by the United States Navy for possible use as USS West Nohno (ID-4029) but was neither taken into the Navy nor ever commissioned under that name.

West Nohno was built in 1919 for the USSB, as a part of the West ships, a series of steel-hulled cargo ships built on the West Coast of the United States for the World War I war effort, and was the 24th ship built at Northwest Steel in Portland, Oregon. Completed too late for that conflict, she operated for a number of years as a merchant ship sailing to African ports for the American West African Line.

In November 1941, West Nohno became the first American merchant ship to be armed prior to the United States' entry into World War II. Shortly after the U.S. entry to that conflict, she was employed for one roundtrip to the Soviet Union in March 1942. After her return, she sailed mainly between the United States and United Kingdom ports. In 1943, a civilian crewman aboard West Nohno was convicted of sedition for trying to incite a rebellion among members of the ship's crew and Naval Armed Guard. In February 1944, she sailed from the United States for the final time, and was scuttled in June as part of the "gooseberry" breakwater off Utah Beach during the Normandy invasion, earning a battle star for the ship.

Design and construction 
The West ships were cargo ships of similar size and design built by several shipyards on the West Coast of the United States for the USSB for emergency use during World War I. All were given names that began with the word West, like West Nohno, the one of some 40 West ships built by the Northwest Steel of Portland, Oregon. West Nohno (Northwest Steel yard number 24, USSB hull number 1080) was launched 12 February 1919 and completed in May 1919.

Early career 
West Nohno was inspected by the United States Navy after completion for possible use and was assigned the identification number of 4029. Had she been commissioned, she would have been known as USS West Nohno (ID-4029), but the Navy neither took over the ship nor commissioned her.

Information on West Nohnos early career is incomplete, but through the end of 1920 the cargo ship sailed on a New York – Glasgow route. By early 1922, West Nohno was sailing for the USSB-owned American West African Line. The principal ports visited by American West African ships were Dakar, Freetown, Monrovia, and Lagos. News items reported that West Nohno also visited Teneriffe, Accra, Las Palmas, Grand-Bassam, Seccondee, and Saint Vincent. West Nohno was still on African routes as late as 1928, when the USSB began accepting bids for the purchase of the American West African Line.

From 1928 to 1941, little is known about West Nohnos activities. At some point during this period, she was laid up as part of a reserve fleet, in which she remained as late as 1939. By May 1941, now under ownership of the United States Maritime Commission (USMC) (a successor to the USSB), the ship had been reactivated and was scheduled to sail in Red Sea service under the operation of American Export Lines. In this Red Sea service, ships would carry materiel for the British to Red Sea and Gulf of Aden ports and carry strategic materials needed by the United States on return journeys.

World War II 

When amendments to the U.S. Neutrality Acts in late 1941 allowed United States merchant ships to be armed for service in the Atlantic, West Nohno became the first vessel so equipped when a large deck gun and three anti-aircraft gun emplacements were installed by workers at the Tietjen & Lang Drydock in Hoboken, New Jersey in late November. While at the shipyard, West Nohnos wheelhouse and radio shack were reinforced with thick walls of concrete to protect against machine-gun bullets, and the ship was repainted "battleship gray".

After her guns were installed, West Nohno had made her way to Sydney, Nova Scotia, by 27 December when she sailed as a part of transatlantic Convoy SC 86. With her destination set for Murmansk, West Nohno peeled off from the convoy and headed to Reykjavík, Iceland. While at anchor in Iceland, West Nohno experienced a winter storm from 15 to 19 January 1942. Apparently suffering no major damage herself in the collision, West Nohno joined Arctic convoy PQ 9, which sailed on 1 February and arrived at Murmansk nine days later. Though the convoy had arrived at its destination, the danger of German attack was still present. German dive bombers would silently glide in below Soviet anti-aircraft fire, drop their payloads, and fly away. Despite the fact that Murmansk had limited port facilities and typically slow unloading of cargo, sometimes requiring ships to remain in port for weeks or months, West Nohno was ready to sail in Convoy QP 8 on 1 March, returning to Reykjavik on 11 March. She sailed for Halifax eleven days later and arrived on 7 April.

West Nohno had made her way to Hampton Roads, Virginia, by 29 May, when she sailed for Key West, Florida. After her 4 June arrival at Key West, she began a nine-month journey to Alexandria, Cairo, and other ports. During this extended voyage, three crewmen entered one of West Nohnos fuel tanks to clean it while the ship was at Suez on 29 September 1942. The crewmen did not use gas masks and were soon overcome by fumes. The second mate of the Norwegian tanker Britannia, Henning Vaagsnes, entered the tank and removed all three men. Two of West Nohnos men survived but the third, despite two hours of attempts to revive him by Vaagsnes, did not. For his efforts, Vaagsnes received a pair of binoculars from U.S. president Franklin D. Roosevelt and a gold watch from the ship owners. He was also awarded St. Olav's medal with Oak Branch, a medal awarded for personal courage and bravery by the Norwegian government.

In February 1943, the West Nohno completed her nine-month journey when she arrived at Mobile, Alabama, after sailing via Guantánamo Bay, Cuba, and Key West. The Chicago Daily Tribune reported that during this voyage, seaman James Orville Couchois had incited subordination and disloyalty among the crew. The head of the Naval Armed Guard detachment aboard West Nohno reported Couchois' activities, as well as comments from other crew members on the ship. After the ship had docked at Mobile, Couchois was removed from the ship and ultimately faced a trial for sedition. Couchois, who was the deck manager for the National Maritime Union of the Congress of Industrial Organizations, was convicted and sentenced to a prison term of five years.

In late March, West Nohno began the first of three Boston–Liverpool round trips. On the Halifax–Liverpool leg of this first trip, she had some unspecified problem that required her return to Halifax, but it must have been a minor problem since she sailed again for Liverpool a week later. The cargo ship returned to Boston on 3 June and began her second voyage to Liverpool on 30 June. While in the UK she called at Loch Ewe, Methil, and Oban in July and August before her 6 September return to Boston. Her third journey was an extended one that began by sailing from Boston on 3 October. She arrived at Liverpool three weeks later. During the next seven weeks, she made her way to Milford Haven, from which she began her last westbound transatlantic crossing on 13 December. West Nohno arrived in Boston on 5 January 1944.

Final voyage 
West Nohno had been selected to become one of the blockships for the Allied invasion of France, then in the planning stages. Though the specific modifications performed on West Nohno are not revealed in sources, modifications for other ships do appear. In November 1944, The Christian Science Monitor reported that blockships dispatched from Boston, like West Nohno, had been loaded with "tons of sand and cement" and had been rigged with explosive charges before departing the port. Further, existing antiaircraft weapons had been moved higher up on the ship and supplemented by additional guns. An account by Cesar Poropat, chief engineer aboard , another blockship dispatched from Boston, mentions that transverse bulkheads aboard that ship were cut open to facilitate sinking.

West Nohno departed Boston on 24 February and arrived at Halifax two days later. Departing from that port on 29 February, she sailed in Convoy HX-281 and arrived at Milford Haven on 15 March. She departed there for Portsmouth the same day. West Nohnos whereabouts and movements through early June are not recorded. Other ships that had been selected as blockships assembled in a "corncob" fleet at Oban, though it's not clear if West Nohno did or not. The "corncob" fleet was the group of ships intended to be sunk to form the "gooseberries", shallow-water artificial harbors for landing craft. Poropat reports that once the ship crews were told of their mission while anchored at Oban, they were not permitted to leave the ships.

Three "corncob" convoys, consisting of what one author called the "dregs of the North Atlantic shipping pool", departed from Poole and reached the Normandy beachhead the next day, shortly after the D-Day landings. Poropat reports that the corncob ships traveled under cover of darkness and, stripped of all unnecessary equipment, carried no radios, having only a signal lamp (with a spare bulb) for communication. Once at the designated location, the ships were put into position and scuttled over the next days, under heavy German artillery fire. Naval Armed Guardsmen manned the guns on all the gooseberry ships to protect against frequent German air attacks; West Nohnos gunners assisted in shooting down several planes on 10 June. All the while, harbor pilots—about half of the New York Bar Pilots Association, according to one source—carefully positioned the ships. Even though she had been sunk, West Nohno continued to serve as an antiaircraft platform manned by Navy gun crews until 18 June, and by Army crews after that date. West Nohnos naval gunners were awarded a battle star for participation in the Normandy Landings.

Awards
Harold T. Andrews was an ordinary seaman on the SS West Nohno on 15 September 1942 when the ship was in Suez, Egypt, There an engineer officer had been overcome by gases in a forepeak tank. Andrews lost his life trying to rescue the engineer. He was given the Merchant Marine Distinguished Service Medal by The President of the United States. For the President the award was given by Admiral Emory S. Land.

Notes

References

Bibliography 

 
 
 
 
 
 
 
 
 
 

 

Design 1013 ships
Ships built in Portland, Oregon
1919 ships
Cargo ships of the United States
World War II merchant ships of the United States
World War II shipwrecks in the Atlantic Ocean
Shipwrecks of France
Scuttled vessels
Ships sunk as breakwaters